David E. Moore (1789  – 1875) was a nineteenth-century American politician from Virginia.

Early life
Moore was born in Rockbridge County, Virginia in 1798.

Education 
Moore was educated at Washington College where graduated in 1817.

Career
Moore was elected to the Virginia General Assembly from Rockbridge County.

From 1843-75 Moore was the Commonwealth’s Attorney of Rockbridge County, serving through the American Civil War under the Confederate regime.

In 1850, Moore was elected to the Virginia Constitutional Convention of 1850. He was one of five delegates elected from the Valley delegate district made up of his home district of Rockbridge County as well as Augusta and Highland Counties.

Moore served as a trustee of Washington College 1845-75.

Death
Moore lived in Rockbridge County.

David E. Moore died in Virginia in 1875.

References 

Members of the Virginia House of Delegates
1798 births
1875 deaths
People from Rockbridge County, Virginia
Washington and Lee University alumni
County and city Commonwealth's Attorneys in Virginia